The 2010 European Athletics Championships were the 20th edition of the European Athletics Championships, organised under the supervision of the European Athletic Association. They were held at the Estadi Olímpic Lluís Companys in Barcelona, Catalonia, Spain from 27 July to 1 August 2010. Barcelona was the first Spanish city to host the European Championships.

Barni was the mascot of the event, he was the main promotional tool of the Championship. His name comes from Barna and was designed by the workshop Dortoka.

Event schedule

Men's results

Track
2002 | 2006 | 2010 | 2012 | 2014

1 Stanislav Emelyanov of Russia originally won the 20 km walk gold medal with a time of 1:20:10, but he was  disqualified in 2014 after he tested positive for drugs.

Field
2002 | 2006 | 2010 | 2012 | 2014

2 Andrei Mikhnevich of Belarus originally won the gold medal in 21.01 m, but was disqualified in 2013 (all his results starting from the 2005 World Championships were canceled).

Women's results

Doping cases
The women's medal standings were significantly altered after various post-race doping controversies. The following medals were revoked years after the event for doping cases, and assigned to the athletes who followed in the ranking.

Track
2002 | 2006 | 2010 | 2012 | 2014

 Živilė Balčiūnaitė (LIT) won the Marathon, but was disqualified for doping after testing positive for testosterone.
 Nailiya Yulamanova (RUS) came second in the Marathon, and was set to be upgraded to gold winner after Živilė Balčiūnaitė was disqualified. However, in July 2012, Yulamanova was also disqualified for doping, and her results from 20 August 2009 onwards were annulled due to abnormalities in her biological passport profile.
 Mariya Savinova (RUS) won the 800 metres but was disqualified in 2017 for doping, and her result annulled.

Field
2002 | 2006 | 2010 | 2012 | 2014

Participating nations 

 (2)
 (6)
 (3)
 (15)
 (5)
 (42)
 (32)
 (2)
 (17)
 (12)
 (10)
 (41)
 (15)
 (17)
 (39)
 (60)
 (2)
 (74)
 (1)
 (72)
 (33)
 (23)
 (6)
 (30)
 (16)
 (73)
 (21)
 (1)
 (25)
 (1)
 (2)
 (2)
 (6)
 (1)
 (2)
 (36)
 (38)
 (71)
 (42)
 (33)
 (105)
 (2)
 (11)
 (19)
 (33)
 (host) (88)
 (41)
 (22)
 (20)
 (62)

In brackets: Squad size

Medal table

 † = Totals following the removal of José Luis Blanco bronze medal in the steeplechase due to positive doping test.
 †2  = Totals following the removal of Nailya Yulamanova gold medal in the marathon due to positive doping test.
 †3  = Totals following the removal of Andrei Mikhnevich gold medal in the shot put due to positive doping test.
 †4  = Totals following the disqualification of Marta Domínguez.

See also
List of stripped European Athletics Championships medals
2010 African Championships in Athletics

References

External links 

 Official website
 EAA Official website
 EAA calendar

 
2010
2010
European Athletics Championships
A
Athletics competitions in Catalonia
International athletics competitions hosted by Spain
Ath
Sports competitions in Barcelona
August 2010 sports events in Europe
July 2010 sports events in Europe
2010s in Barcelona
Athletics in Barcelona